This is a list of Portuguese television related events from 1993.

Events
20 February - Televisão Independente launches, becoming the fourth terrestrial channel in Portugal, just over five months after the launch of Sociedade Independente de Comunicação, Portugal's first private television channel.
Unknown - Debut of Chuva de Estrelas, a series hosted by Catarina Furtado in which members of the public impersonate their favourite singers.

Debuts
Unknown - Chuva de Estrelas (1993-2000)

Television shows

1990s
Roda da Sorte (1990-1994, 2008)

Ending this year

Births

Deaths